The 1950 Michigan State Normal Hurons football team represented Michigan State Normal College (later renamed Eastern Michigan University) in the Interstate Intercollegiate Athletic Conference (IIAC) during the 1950 college football season. In their second season under head coach Harry Ockerman, the Hurons compiled a 3–6 record (0–4 against IIAC opponents) and were outscored by their opponents, 194 to 123. Dr. James R. Wichterman was the team captain. Harry Mail was selected as a first-team player on the All-IIAC team.

Schedule

See also
 1950 in Michigan

References

Michigan State Normal
Eastern Michigan Eagles football seasons
Michigan State Normal Hurons football